Grotesque was a Swedish death metal/black metal band.

History
The band formed in Gothenburg, Sweden in September 1988 by former members of Conquest: Kristian Wåhlin (Necrolord) and Per Nordgren (Virgintaker), with the addition of Tomas Lindberg (Goatspell). The band was, however, short-lived and recorded a few demos and an EP. The band's original drummer Shamaatae formed the black metal band Arckanum in 1993. After the demise of Grotesque, Lindberg and Svensson started At the Gates, while Necrolord created his own band Liers in Wait and focused more on creating artwork for several bands including Dissection and Emperor. In 1996, three members—Goatspell, Necrolord, and Offensor—got back together and recorded two songs for the release of a compilation album, which was later re-released as a split album with At the Gates EP Gardens of Grief.

Grotesque briefly reformed in 2007 for a single invite-only concert on January 26 in Stockholm, to celebrate the publication of Daniel Ekeroth's book Swedish Death Metal. Nirvana 2002 and Interment also reunited for the concert.

Members
Tomas Lindberg (Goatspell) - Vocals (1988–1990, 1996, 2007)
Kristian Wåhlin (Necrolord) - Guitar (1988–1990, 1996, 2007)
Insultor - Guitar (2007)
Per Nordgren (Virgintaker) - Bass (1988, 2007)
Tomas Eriksson (Offensor) - Drums (1989–1990, 1996, 2007)

Former members
Alf Svensson - Guitar (1990)
Nuctemeron - Bass (1988–1989)
Shamaatae - Drums (1988–1989)

Discography
Ripped from the Cross (demo, 1988)
The Black Gate Is Closed (demo, 1989)
Incantation (EP, 1990)
In the Embrace of Evil (compilation, 1996)

References

External links
Black Sun Records Page with biography, discography, and sample - Currently Offlline
Tartarean Desire biography

Swedish black metal musical groups
Swedish death metal musical groups
Musical groups established in 1988
Musical quintets